Fatigue is the second record by Brooklyn-based experimental musician Taja Cheek, under the moniker of L'Rain. It is her first recording with record label Mexican Summer. Fatigue builds on Cheek's experimental compositional approach, drawing from an eclectic collection of genres and employing field recording elements. Instrumentally, it has help from twenty collaborators, who lend the record clavinet, saxophone, and more.

Upon its release, Fatigue was greeted with rave reviews. It was named the best album of the year by British magazine The Wire.

Background
Taja Cheek planned on naming her second record Suck Teeth because she "loved how it encapsulated a very black sound of disapproval, annoyance, and disappointment."

Composition
Fatigue has musical footing in experimental pop, as well as orchestral pop. However, the record contains diverse songs that bend genre. Ambient music, gospel, jazz, post-punk, neo soul, R&B, shoegazing, soft rock and sound collage have all been melded into L'Rain's own aesthetic.

Fatigue makes significant use of field recordings. The latter half of "Find It" samples a pastor singing at a funeral Cheek attended. "Black Clap" has sounds from a hand game she created alongside co-producer and multi-instrumentalist Ben Chapoteau-Katz. About it, she said that "in the studio, I was thinking about ways that play can improve your life, and I was like, 'I'll just make up a hand game, because that's something I used to do when I was a kid.'" 

It is also shaded in psychedelia, with its songs working in neo-psychedelia. Psychedelic musicians like Syd Barrett and quartet Animal Collective have been noted as spiritual touchstones for L'Rain's music. L'Rain has cited the latter's early recordings as informative to her.

The second song, "Find It", digs into "warped, genre-mashing" pop-soul and "sweet, distorted" shoegaze pop. Experimentation continues even when songs dip into conventional pop and dance sounds, like on "Kill Self" and "Two Face". The latter song's R&B yields a "heady cacophony".

Critical reception

Fatigue was welcomed with critical applause upon its release. On Metacritic, the record holds a score of 86 out of 100, based on seven reviews, indicating "universal acclaim".

Paul Simpson for AllMusic applauded the record, seeing it as "even bolder and dreamier than [her] self-titled debut" and "a uniquely powerful expression of her uncompromising vision."  Aymeric Dubois for The Line of Best Fit called it "reflective and exposing...a transformative listen".

Accolades

Semester-end lists

Year-end lists

Track listing

Personnel
Adapted from the record's Bandcamp page.

References 

2021 albums
Experimental pop albums 
Mexican Summer albums